High-speed rail in Australia has been under investigation since the early 1980s. Every Federal Government since this time has investigated the feasibility of constructing high-speed rail with speeds above 200 km/h, but to date nothing has ever gone beyond the detailed planning stage. The most commonly suggested route is between Australia's two largest cities, Sydney and Melbourne, which is the world's second- or third-busiest air corridor. Various corridors have been proposed for a potential high-speed line. The distance between them is around 800 km (500 miles), which requires very high speeds to make trains competitive with air travel.

The Australian rail speed record of 210 km/h was set by Queensland Rail's Electric Tilt Train during a trial run in 1998. The Transwa WDA/WDB/WDC class, V/Line VLocity, XPT and the diesel and electric Tilt Trains operate at a maximum speed of 160 km/h in passenger service, which qualifies as higher-speed rail.

Overview

The construction of a high-speed rail link along the east coast has been the target of several investigations since the early 1980s. Air travel dominates the inter-capital travel market, and intra-rural travel is almost exclusively car-based. Rail has a significant presence in the rural / city fringe commuter market, but inter-capital rail currently has very low market share due to low speeds and infrequent service. However, travel times between the capitals by high-speed rail could be as fast as or faster than air travel, as the 2013 High Speed Rail Study Phase 2 Report estimated that conventional high-speed rail express journeys from Sydney to Melbourne would take 2 hours and 44 minutes, while those from Sydney to Brisbane would take 2 hours and 37 minutes.

Various studies and recommendations have asserted that a high-speed rail service between the major eastern capital cities could be viable as an alternative to air. Although such studies have generated much interest from the private sector and captured the imagination of the general public upon their release, to date no private-sector proposal has been able to demonstrate financial viability without the need for significant government assistance.

However, a mature high-speed rail system would be more economically competitive than air and locomotive travel, provide mass transit and have a duration of travel that would compare with air travel or be quicker, and would reduce national carbon dioxide emissions.

In 2012, over 12 million people lived along the Sydney–Melbourne rail corridor.

History
The following is a non-exhaustive overview of semi-high-speed/higher-speed and high-speed rail projects in Australia.

1970s–1980s
The rail network has long been a target of proposals for improvement. The 1979 Premiers' Meeting proposed the electrification of the Sydney–Melbourne line to improve transit time from over 12 hours to under 10, but a senate committee found this was not justified on economic grounds. In 1981, the Institution of Engineers proposed the Bicentennial High-Speed Railway Project, which proposed to link the five capitals of south-eastern Australia (Adelaide, Melbourne, Canberra, Sydney and Brisbane) in time for the Australian Bicentenary. However, it proposed only the strengthening and partial electrification of the existing tracks, new deviations to bypass the worst sections, additional passing loops, and the purchase of new diesel-electric trains. It would offer only mild improvements on the existing travel times: Sydney to Canberra in three hours, and Sydney to Melbourne in nine; it cannot therefore be considered a true high-speed rail proposal.

1980s

New South Wales XPT 

In January 1978 the Public Transport Commission invited tenders for 25 high-speed railcars similar to the Prospector railcars delivered by Comeng to the Western Australian Government Railways in 1971. The tender allowed bidders to suggest alternative types of high-speed train. Comeng submitted a tender for a train based on the British Rail designed InterCity 125 which had entered service with British Rail in October 1976. In August 1979, Comeng was announced as the successful bidder for an order of 100 vehicles. By the time the contract was signed in March 1980, the order was only for 10 power cars and 20 carriages, enough to form four five-carriage trains with two spare power cars.

A different light cluster was fitted along with three high-beam spotlights mounted to the roof. The passenger trailer cars were based on a Budd design, with the British Rail Mark 3 trailers considered unsuitable.

The XPT entered service in 1982. However, the train is not often used to its full potential, operating along winding steam-era alignments, and at times has had the top speed limited due to track condition and level crossing incidents. However, it can theoretically reach speeds of 200 km/h.

XPT trains currently operate services from Sydney to Melbourne, Brisbane and Dubbo.

1984 CSIRO proposal 

The first true high-speed rail proposal was presented to the Hawke Government in June 1984 by the CSIRO, spearheaded by its chairman, Dr Paul Wild. The proposal was to link Melbourne, Canberra and Sydney via a coastal corridor, based on French TGV technology. The proposal estimated construction costs at A$2.5 billion ($7.0 billion in 2013), with initial revenue of A$150 million per annum exceeding operating costs of A$50 million per annum. The proposal attracted much public and media attention, as well as some private sector capital for feasibility studies.

In September 1984, the Bureau of Transport Economics found that the probable construction costs had been underestimated by A$1.5 billion, and the proposal would therefore be uneconomic. The Minister for Transport, Peter Morris, rejected the proposal.

Very Fast Train (VFT) joint venture 

Later in 1984 Peter Abeles, chairman of TNT, expressed interest in Dr Wild's proposal.

Two years later in September 1986, the Very Fast Train Joint Venture was established, comprising Elders IXL, Kumagai Gumi, TNT and later BHP, with Dr Wild as chairman. They proposed a 350 km/h rail link from Sydney to Canberra via Goulburn, and then on to Melbourne via the coastal route (or alternatively the inland route). A feasibility study estimated to cost A$19 million ($39.5 million in 2013) was initiated by the group in 1988. In 1989, after talks with the Queensland Government, the joint venture group also performed a preliminary analysis of a coastal link to Brisbane. In 1990 the joint venture released the results of the major feasibility study, simply titled VFT – Project Evaluation. It proposed an inland route between Melbourne, Sydney and Canberra, with intermediate stations at Campbelltown, Bowral, Goulburn, Yass, Wagga Wagga, Albury-Wodonga, Benalla, Seymour and Melbourne Airport. It was estimated to cost $6.6 billion ($11.9 billion in 2013) and take five years to construct, beginning in 1992.

The VFT was opposed by numerous groups, notably the Australian Conservation Foundation and the Australian Democrats. Concerns centred around the environmental impact a coastal corridor would have on fragile ecosystems, noise pollution and the amount of public money that might be required.

After the release of the project evaluation, negotiations continued between the joint venture and state and federal governments. A favourable tax regime was sought, without which it was claimed that the project would not be economically viable. Premier of South Australia John Bannon was among the vocal proponents of tax breaks for major infrastructure projects such as the VFT. In August 1991, the Hawke Cabinet rejected the proposed tax breaks after it was claimed they would have cost A$1.4 billion. Subsequently the VFT Joint Venture folded.

1990s

Tilting trains 

During the 1990s there were several investigations into the use of tilting trains on existing tracks. In January 1990 it was reported that the NSW government was considering upgrading the existing state railway lines to utilise tilting train technology under development by Swedish-Swiss engineering giant ASEA Brown Boveri. This was at the same time as the VFT was under investigation, and there was concern that two fast railways could end up being built, which would then both be financially unviable. The tilt train concept could potentially reach speeds of up to  while using the existing tracks.

From February to June 1995, CountryLink leased three X 2000 tilting carriages from Swedish Railways. The X 2000 carriages were driven by two XPT power cars in a push-pull configuration, and modified to provide hotel power. The train visited 39 cities and covered some 95,000km during its tour of the state. 18,525 passengers were carried during an eight-week trial service between Sydney and Canberra. This service had a scheduled timetable of 3hrs 25min (compared to the 4hrs 07min of the existing XPLORER service), and recorded curve speeds up to 44% higher than XPT speed boards during regular service. Maximum speed was limited to 160km/h, due to safety regulations at level crossings, as well as the physical demands on drivers in the non-tilting power cars.

The greatest challenge was the carriages' relatively wide clearance profile, which necessitated a targeted program of platform cutbacks and track slews on the Sydney-Canberra route. However, the trial was otherwise a great success. The track's transition curves were found to be well suited to the X2000's capability of 4° tilt angle per second. Furthermore, track studies indicated that the X2000 exerted lower track forces than the XPT, due to its self-steering bogies. The service was popular with passengers, who were impressed with the faster service and the features of the carriages.

While the speed improvement over the existing timetable was modest, it was estimated that the Sydney-Canberra timetable could be reduced to as low as 2hrs, with investment in track improvements and deviations in the order of $500 million. Media coverage of the trial focused on technical issues (particularly clearance and transitions), dubbing it a case of a "fast train on slow track." No major track work was undertaken, as the Federal government was awaiting the outcome of the alternative "Speedrail" proposal.

Speedrail proposal 

In 1993, the Speedrail Consortium (a joint venture between Alstom and Leighton Contractors) made a proposal for a high-speed rail link between Sydney and Canberra. It was initially going to cost A$2.4 billion ($4.1 billion in 2013). After years of delays and more claims that massive government subsidies would be required, in March 1997 the Commonwealth, New South Wales and ACT governments formally invited expressions of interest; by July, six proponents had been shortlisted. In December 1997, the government received four proposals, all accompanied by the required A$100,000 deposit. The proponents were:
Capital Rail, backed by ASEA Brown Boveri, Adtranz, SwedeRail, BT Corporate Finance, Ove Arup, TMG International, Ansett and Virgin Rail Group. Their proposal was a $1.2 billion upgrade of the existing line, which would allow a 1 hour 45-minute service using a more powerful 250 km/h variant of the Swedish Railways X 2000 tilting electric multiple unit, dubbed XNEC.
 Inter-Capital Express, backed by AIDC Australia, GHD Transmark, Lend Lease, Siemens, TNT and GB Railways. Proposed journey time and cost the same as for Capital Rail, using similar tilt-train rollingstock and alignment upgrades.
 Speedrail Consortium, Backed by GEC Alsthom, Leighton Contractors, SNCF, Commonwealth Bank, Qantas, and Baulderstone Hornibrook. Proposal involved construction of a new alignment from Glenfield to Canberra at a cost of $2–2.6 billion, and the use of the existing Sydney metro rail network to access Central station. TGV technology would be used, giving a travel time of 1 hour, 20 minutes.
 Transrapid, backed by ThyssenKrupp, BHP, Boral, John Holland, Pacific Dunlop, Siemens and Adtranz, made a radical proposal for a 60-minute magnetic-levitation service via Wollongong. Detailed cost estimates were not given, but government sources estimated the cost to be at least $4 billion.

On 4 August 1998, Prime Minister John Howard announced that Speedrail was the preferred party, and gave the go ahead for the project to move into the 'proving up' stage, on the understanding that if the project proceeded, it would be at "no net cost to the taxpayer". It was predicted that construction would cost A$3.5 billion ($5.4 billion in 2013), with 15,000 new jobs created during the construction period. It was planned that the line would use the East Hills line to depart Sydney, and then follow the Hume and Federal highways into Canberra. There would be stations at Central, Campbelltown, Southern Highlands, Goulburn and Canberra Airport.
The line was to operate under a build–own–operate model, that would allow a private company to manage the network, but would then be transferred to government after 30 years.

In November 1999, Speedrail submitted a feasibility study to the government, claiming that the project satisfied all the government's requirements. However, the media still speculated that A$1 billion in government assistance or tax concessions would be required. In December 2000, the federal government terminated the proposal due to fears it would require excessive subsidies.

Queensland Tilt Train 

In March 1993 Queensland Rail issued a tender for the construction of two electric six-carriage tilting trains. In October 1994 a contract was awarded to Walkers, Maryborough with Hitachi to supply the electrical and tilting equipment.

After an extensive program, on 6 November 1998 Australia's first pair of tilting trains entered service on the Spirit of Capricorn between Brisbane and Rockhampton. With a journey time of seven hours, they shaved over two hours from the schedule operated by InterCity Express sets. In July 1999 a second daily service was introduced between Brisbane and Bundaberg.

This makes it Australia's only train to exceed the common definition of high-speed rail, and also makes it the fastest narrow-gauge train in the world. The maximum speed of the Tilt Train in normal service is 160 km/h.

In August 1999 a contract was awarded to Walkers for two diesel tilting trains to operate services from Brisbane to Cairns. In contrast to the Electric Tilt Train, the diesel Tilt Train is a push-pull locomotive based train.

In October 2010 Downer Rail was awarded a contract to build a further diesel tilt train with two power cars and 12 carriages to replace locomotive hauled stock on The Sunlander. The existing two diesel sets will be overhauled and extended to 10 carriages. All work was performed in Maryborough. The first refurbished set entered service in October 2013. The third and brand new set was delivered and entered service in 2014.

2000s

Howard government (2000) 
In December 2000 in the wake of the termination of the Speedrail proposal, the Howard Government commissioned TMG International Pty Ltd, leading a team of specialist subconsultants, including Arup, to investigate all aspects of the design and implementation of a high-speed rail system linking Melbourne, Canberra, Sydney and Brisbane. The East Coast Very High Speed Train Scoping Study – Phase 1 was released in November 2001 and cost A$2.3 million to prepare. It dealt with high-speed rail technologies, corridor selection, operating performance and transit times, project costs, projected demand, financing, and national development impacts. Although the preliminary study did not undertake a detailed corridor analysis, it recommended the selection of an inland route between Melbourne and Sydney, and a coastal route between Sydney and Brisbane.

The report concluded that although a high-speed rail system could have a place in Australia's transport future, it would require years of bipartisan political vision to realise (construction time was estimated at 10–20 years), and would most likely require significant financial investment from the government – up to 80% of construction costs. Construction cost estimates indicated a strong dependence on the chosen design speed; the construction costs for a double-track east coast high-speed railway would be (2001 ): 
250 km/h: $33 – $41 billion
350 km/h: $38 – $47 billion
500 km/h (maglev): $56 – $59 billion

These numbers do not include rollingstock or the cost of setting up the operating company. The report noted that these costs could be reduced somewhat upon detailed corridor analysis (especially the lower speed options) if sections of existing rail or highway corridor could be utilised.

In March 2002, the Government decided not to go ahead with phase 2 of the scoping study due to the finding that an enormous amount of public funding would be required for the massive infrastructure project.

Transwa WDA/WDB/WDC class 

In December 2000 Westrail awarded a contract to United Goninan, Broadmeadow for nine railcars to replace the 1971 built WAGR WCA/WCE class railcars. Seven were for The Prospector and two for the AvonLink service.

The first entered service on 28 June 2004. Power is provided by Cummins engines.

Canberra Business Council study 
In April 2008 the Canberra Business Council made a submission to Infrastructure Australia, High Speed Rail for Australia: An opportunity for the 21st century. The submission detailed:

 Improvements in technology, competitiveness and supply over the previous decade.
 Travel demand on the East Coast. The Melbourne–Sydney air route is the fourth-busiest in the world, and the Sydney–Brisbane route ranks seventh in the Asia-Pacific region.
 Increased standard of living.
 Use for freight. High-speed freight trains are in use in France and soon to expand across Europe.
 Environmental sustainability and reduced greenhouse gas emissions.
 Energy efficiency.
 Better social outcomes, quality of life, and reduced social disadvantage for regional centres on the rail line.

Canberra Airport plan 
In 2009, Canberra Airport proposed that it would be the most appropriate location for a Second Sydney Airport, providing a high-speed rail link was built that could reduce travel times between the cities to 50 minutes. Given the existing development within the Sydney basin, a HSR link will probably be required whatever site is chosen, yet the Canberra option save up to A$22 billion which would be needed to develop a greenfields airport site at Badgerys Creek or Wilton.
In June 2012, Canberra Airport unveiled plans to build a A$140 million rail terminal at the airport if the high-speed link goes ahead.

High-Speed Rail Study (2008–2013)

Announcement of the study 
In December 2008, the Rudd Government announced that a Very Fast Train along the Sydney–Melbourne corridor, estimated to cost A$25 billion, was the government's highest infrastructure priority. On 31 October 2010, the Government issued the terms of reference for a strategic study to inform it and the New South Wales, Victorian, Queensland and Australian Capital Territory governments about implementation of HSR on the east coast of Australia between Melbourne and Brisbane—it cost $20 million and was undertaken in two phases.

The initiative was supported by both the Liberal opposition and the Australian Greens, the latter of which called for the study's scope to be extended to encompass Adelaide and Perth, a sentiment that was echoed by some.

In 2013 the Australian government released the finished study, with the proposed route linking Melbourne, Canberra, Sydney, and Brisbane.

Phase 1 
The report of phase 1, released on 4 August 2011, identified corridors and station locations and potential patronage, and gave indicative estimates of the cost. The first phase of the study was completed in 2011, projecting a financial cost for high-speed rail of between $61 and A$108 billion, depending on the route and station combination that was selected.

The phase 1 report found that an HSR corridor between Brisbane and Melbourne could:

 cost between A$61 billion and A$108 billion (2011 dollars)
 involve more than 1,600 kilometres of new standard-gauge, double-track
 achieve speeds of up to 350 kilometres per hour and offer journey times as low as 3 hours between both Brisbane and Sydney and Sydney and Melbourne, 40 minutes from Sydney to Newcastle, and 1 hour between Sydney and Canberra
 carry about 54 million passengers a year by 2036
 offer competitive ticket prices.

The report noted that acquiring, or otherwise preserving the corridor in the short term could reduce future costs by reducing the likelihood of additional tunnels as urban areas grow and preferred corridors become unavailable.

Phase 2 
Work on phase 2 of the study started in late 2011 and culminated in the release of the High speed rail study phase 2 report on 11 April 2013. Building on the work of phase 1, it was more comprehensive in objectives and scope, and refined many of the phase 1 estimates, particularly demand and cost estimates.

The phase 2 report found that:

 the corridor would comprise about 1,750 kilometres of dedicated route linking Brisbane, Sydney, Canberra and Melbourne
 the preferred alignment included four capital city stations, four city-peripheral stations, and stations at the Gold Coast, Casino, Grafton, Coffs Harbour, Port Macquarie, Taree, Newcastle, Southern Highlands, Wagga Wagga, Albury-Wodonga and Shepparton
 once fully operational (from 2065) [sic], the corridor could carry about 84 million passengers a year
 express journey times would be less than three hours between Melbourne and Sydney and between Sydney and Brisbane
 optimal staging for the HSR program would involve building the Sydney–Melbourne line first, starting with Sydney–Canberra, followed by Canberra–Melbourne, Newcastle–Sydney, Brisbane–Gold Coast and Gold Coast–Newcastle
 the estimated cost of constructing the corridor in its entirety would be about A$114 billion (2012 dollars)
 the HSR program and the majority of its individual stages would be expected to produce only a small positive financial return on investment. so governments would need to fund the majority of the upfront capital costs
 if passenger projections were met at the fare levels proposed, the HSR system could generate sufficient revenue from fares and other activities to meet operating costs without ongoing public subsidy
 HSR would substantially improve accessibility for the regional centres it served and provide opportunity for – although not the automatic realisation of – regional development.

Favoured alignment 
Also released alongside the phase 2 report were 280 detailed maps showing the preferred alignment identified in the study. They resolve the various earlier alternative routes outlined in the Wikipedia article Corridor selection history for Australian High-Speed Rail.

NOTE: Air travel time includes travel from CBD to airport, waiting at terminal, gate-to-gate transit, and travel to destination CBD.

Issues 
The major issues preventing the adoption of high-speed rail include, according to Philip Laird:
 a high level of competition in domestic air travel, resulting in highly affordable fares.
 excessive domestic air transport subsidies.
 that the great inter-city distances exceed those for which high-speed rail can compete effectively against aircraft.
 a perception of cheap car travel.
 a lack of tolls on the majority of inter-capital roads.

2010s

Abbott government (2013–2015) 
On 8 November 2013 the High Speed Rail Advisory Group, charged with part of the planning for a very fast train between Brisbane and Melbourne, was one of 20 government committees and councils identified to be wound up as part of the newly elected Abbott Government's initial efforts to cut costs and "ensure that the machinery of government is as efficient and as small as possible".

However, the following month, former Deputy Prime Minister Warren Truss announced that the Coalition was committed to acquiring the land corridor identified by the previous government's study, and that he was personally seeking the co-operation of the premiers of Victoria, New South Wales and Queensland, and the Chief Minister of the ACT.

The Labor Party indicated it would support the move.

Beyond Zero Emissions Study (2014) 
In 2014, the low-carbon advocacy group Beyond Zero Emissions released a detailed study in response to the Rudd government's Phase 2 report. Prepared in collaboration with the German Aerospace Centre, the study used many of the same cost assumptions but proposed a modified route to minimise construction expense. Although slightly longer (1799 km compared to 1748 km), the length in tunnel was reduced by 44%, and the length on bridges by 25%. Much of the reduction came through making greater use of existing transport corridors for metropolitan access; the government study took the politically uncomplicated but extremely expensive option of simply tunnelling to the terminal stations. Project author Gerard Drew also criticised the Phase 2 Report's 45-year construction timeline, calling it "laughable". Drew also suggested that there was significant "gold plating" evident in the government report's cost estimates. BZE forecast that the high-speed railway would cost $84.3 billion and take 10 years to construct.

Turnbull government (2015–2018) 
When leadership of the Liberal Party changed to Malcolm Turnbull, a noted rail enthusiast, the Federal Government revived talk of high-speed rail proposals for Australia, with a focus on private-sector proposals and value-capture funding models.

In March 2016 the government received an unsolicited proposal from a group called Consolidated Land and Rail Australia (CLARA), proposing a very fast railway (500 km/h class) between Sydney and Melbourne. Rather than serving existing population centres, the proposal centred on creating 8 new inland cities as commuter towns for Sydney and Melbourne, with construction of both the cities and the railway to be funded by land sales. Clara claimed to have already secured purchase options for 40% of the land required for the cities.

In April 2017, Spanish rollingstock manufacturer Talgo presented an unsolicited proposal to the NSW government, in which it was proposed to utilize passively tilting diesel rollingstock, capable of speeds up to 200 km/h, to increase speeds on the Sydney-Canberra line. With minimal modifications to the existing track, Talgo claimed a travel time as low as 2-2.5hrs could be achieved. The manufacturer offered to bring a Talgo trainset to New South Wales for testing at no cost.

In the May 2017 Federal Budget, the federal government announced $20 million in funding, matching that provided by state/territory or private proponents, for the development of up to three business cases focusing on delivering high-speed rail links between capital cities and regional Australia. Submissions will be appraised by Infrastructure Australia, with the funds to be allocated to the successful proponents. Further funding would be considered following completion of the business case(s).

New South Wales (Late 2018) 

In late 2018, the New South Wales State Government announced a new high-speed rail network connecting Sydney and regional NSW. The government is spending $4.6 million on investigating four identified potential routes. These are Sydney to Port Macquarie, Orange/Parkes, Nowra and Canberra. The proposal offers the following travel times (in hours):

On 24 December 2022, the head of the study, Professor Andrew McNaughton, remarked that in his opinion that fixing "the corridor between Sydney and the Hunter [Sydney-Newcastle]" would make "the biggest difference to the biggest number of people". He also regarded the Sydney-Goulburn and Sydney-Canberra corridors as lower priority, while remarking that those on the Sydney-Orange/Parkes corridor "just need a decent train service".

As of 24 December 2022, the study report has not yet been released, but NSW Cities Minister Rob Stokes commented that McNaughton's work had been "invaluable", and that his recommendations were "demonstrated in our six cities plan to better connect the cities of metropolitan NSW"; Stokes had also written to the federal infrastructure minister Catherine King, asking the newly created High Speed Rail Authority to work with the NSW Greater Cities Commission in regards to planning around the proposed new and upgraded corridors.

On 3 March 2023, it was reported by The Guardian that the New South Wales State Government had, per confidential documents, halted work on the final business case for the Sydney-Newcastle corridor in December 2022 due to it being considered a responsibility for the federal government's proposed High Speed Rail Authority.

Victoria (2018–2019) 
In the 2018 Victorian Budget in April, planning for a fast rail link between Melbourne and Geelong was announced. Later in September 2018, the Victorian State Government announced a Fast Rail Reference Group of technical advisors for a high-speed rail line to Geelong. This followed an allocation of $50 million for planning for the line in the 2018 state budget. The fast rail link formed part of the Labor Government's Western Rail Plan announced before the 2018 Victorian state election. The plan would see regional trains run to Geelong and Ballarat at speeds up to 250 km/h, an increase on the current 160 km/h limit of V/Line VLocity trains. This would lead to a travel time between Geelong and Melbourne of 45 minutes and less than an hour to Ballarat. To achieve this, rail lines would be electrified and quadrupled to Wyndham Vale and Melton to separate regional and metropolitan services. The new fast lines would likely utilise a new Sunshine-CBD rail tunnel to be built as part of the Melbourne Airport rail link, and could use new electrified rolling stock. Under the plan, Sunshine railway station would become a key interchange for high-speed rail and metropolitan services in Melbourne's west. Planning for the high-speed rail will occur alongside the business case for the Airport Rail link, and all projects will likely take a decade to complete, with construction set to begin by 2022.

The plan expands upon current duplication and improvement works to regional passenger rail lines by the State Government's $1.75 billion Regional Rail Revival project.

In March 2019, the Federal Coalition Government pledged $2 billion for a fast rail line to Geelong, promising a maximum speed of 200 km/h, an average travel speed of 160 km/h and a travel time of 32 minutes. The Federal Government claimed this project would have a total cost of $4 billion. The Victorian Transport Minister Jacinta Allan welcomed extra federal funding but dismissed some of the claims about the project, arguing it would cost between $10 to $15 billion, would require the removal of 14 level crossings, and that the federal pledge did not include the cost of new rolling stock.

National Faster Rail Agency (2019-2023) 
In the 2019–20 Budget, the Australian Government established a National Faster Rail Agency to produce a number of business cases for higher-speed rail between capital cities and regional centres. The Government allocated $40 million to assess five fast rail corridors:

 Sydney to Wollongong
 Sydney to Parkes (via Bathurst and Orange)
 Melbourne to Albury-Wodonga
 Melbourne to Traralgon
 Brisbane to the Gold Coast

These assessments were in addition to the three business cases already underway, started under the Turnbull government, examining the following corridors:

 Melbourne to Greater Shepparton
 Sydney to Newcastle
 Brisbane to the regions of Moreton Bay and the Sunshine Coast

The National Faster Rail Agency was established on 1 July 2019 as an Executive Agency within the Infrastructure, Transport, Cities and Regional Development portfolio.

Issues and cost estimate 
In April 2022, the National Faster Rail Agency published the National Faster Rail Investment Program document, part of which was dedicated to high-speed rail. The document explained that as of 2022, their cost estimate for the Melbourne-Sydney-Brisbane HSR corridor was between $200 and $300 billion - significantly higher than the $114 billion cost outlined in Phase 2 of the High-Speed Rail Study - due to reasons including that:

 Recent costings show substantially higher cost per kilometre,
 Concerns were raised over terrain, community acceptance, environmental degradation and industry capacity,
 Previous costings were high level, based on broad plans, had insufficient contingency and were not detailed, and
 Higher costings were incurred across the infrastructure program.

2020s

High Speed Rail Authority (2023-present) 
In September 2022, the recently elected Albanese government introduced legislation to establish a new national High Speed Rail Authority, fulfilling a promise made during the 2022 election. The Infrastructure Minister Catherine King said the Authority would have an expert board and be tasked with overseeing "the construction and operation of a high-speed rail network along Australia's eastern seaboard" between Melbourne, Canberra, Sydney and Brisbane. The authority would consult with state governments, give advice to the federal government, and develop standards to ensure an interoperable high-speed rail network across jurisdictions. King announced the Authority would advance the government's first priority of providing higher-speed rail between Newcastle and Sydney, to which the government committed $500 million to commence early works and secure corridors.

The Bill would abolish the National Faster Rail Agency and absorb its functions into the new authority.

The Bill was passed by both houses on 24 November 2022, and gained assent on 12 December 2022.

Fastrack Australia proposal (2023) 
In January 2023, advocacy group Fastrack Australia published a plan that proposed gradually upgrading the Sydney-Melbourne corridor, instead of building a completely new line from scratch. The proposed upgrades were split into five stages, with the following estimated travel times:

The first two stages would consist of the following upgrades:

 Stage 1: straightening out track on the so-called Wentworth deviation between Glenfield and Mittagong, and
 Stage 2: track between Goulburn and Yass, and a new track branching from Gunning down to a new station near Canberra airport.

The leader of Fastrack Australia, Garry Glazebrook, stated that he estimated the first two stages would cost $5bn and $6-7bn respectively. As of 24 February 2023, Fastrack Australia had sent their proposal to Prime Minister Anthony Albanese and the federal infrastructure minister Catherine King, but were yet to receive a response.

Intrastate proposals
At various times, state political parties and others have proposed schemes involving fast trains in other localities that included the potential to achieve speeds above the 200 km/h threshold.

In 2004, the Government of New South Wales proposed a A$2 billion privately funded underground and above-ground train line Western FastRail that would link the Sydney CBD with Western Sydney. The concept was re-proposed in December 2006 by then federal Opposition Leader Kevin Rudd during a visit to Penrith, as part of the Australian Labor Party's election platform. The plan received approving comments by the NSW State Government. The line was also backed by a consortium led by union leader Michael Easson, which includes Dutch bank ABN AMRO and Australian construction company Leighton Contractors. Elements of the proposal were incorporated into the Government's West Metro and CBD Relief Line projects. However, these plans were abandoned following the election of the O'Farrell government in 2011.

In 2008, Transrapid made a proposal to the Government of Victoria to build a privately funded and operated magnetic levitation (maglev) line to serve the Greater Melbourne metropolitan area. It was presented as an alternative to the Cross-City Tunnel proposed in the Eddington Transport Report, which neglected to investigate above-ground transport options. The maglev route would connect Geelong to metropolitan Melbourne's outer suburban growth corridors, Tullamarine and Avalon domestic and international terminals in under 20 minutes, continuing to Frankston, Victoria, in under 30 minutes. It would serve a population of over 4 million people, and Transrapid claimed a price of A$4 billion. However, the Victorian government dismissed the proposal in favour of the underground metropolitan network suggested by the Eddington Report.

In 2010, Western Australia's Public Transport Authority completed a feasibility study into a high-speed rail link between Perth and Bunbury. The route would follow the existing narrow gauge Mandurah line to Anketell, then the Kwinana Freeway and Forrest Highway to Lake Clifton, including  of new track. It would replace the existing Transwa Australind passenger service, the route of which is under increasing use for freight traffic.

In the lead-up to the 2010 Victorian state election, Liberal leader Ted Baillieu promised to spend A$4 million to set up a high-speed rail advocacy unit, with the goal of ensuring Melbourne hosted Australia's first high-speed trains. He expressed support for an east coast link, and extensions west of Melbourne to Geelong and Adelaide.

The 2010 Infrastructure Partnerships Australia report identified Noosa-Brisbane-Gold Coast as a potentially viable high-speed rail link, and a possible precursor to a full east-coast system. The report predicted that a  system would reduce travel times between Cooroy (22 km west of Noosa) and Brisbane to 31 minutes (currently 2:08 hours), capturing as much as 84% of the total commuter market. Travel time between Brisbane and the Gold Coast would be reduced to 21 minutes, capturing up to 27% of commuters.

Soon after winning the 2011 New South Wales state election, the incoming Liberal premier Barry O'Farrell advocated high-speed rail lines to Melbourne and Brisbane instead of a second Sydney airport, saying of a new airport site in NSW: "Whether the central coast, the south-west or the western suburbs [of Sydney], find me an area that is not going to end up causing enormous grief to people who currently live around it".

Speed records 
The Australian rail speed record is presently held by Queensland Rail's Electric Tilt Train, which achieved 210km/h during a test run on 23 May 1999. It remains the only time a train in Australia has exceeded 200 km/h. Modifications to the tracks were required to achieve the record speed.

The Kalgoorlie Prospector was often referred to "Australia's fastest train" upon its introduction in 1971, however this claim was based on its end-to-end average speed of 85km/h, rather than maximum speed; the Prospector has never held the maximum speed record. The WAGR WCA class railcars had a design speed of 145km/h, but seldom exceeded 130km/h in service.

The News South Wales XPT broke the record during a test run on 9 September 1981, where it reached 183km/h. It broke its own record 11 years later, on 18 September 1992, reaching 193km/h. On both occasions the maximum speed achieved fell short of the target speed of 200km/h.

See also 

 AVE (Alta Velocidad Española), especially the Madrid–Barcelona high-speed rail line 
 Bullet Train for Australia
 NTV Italo
 TGV
 Intercity-Express
 Eurostar
 Shinkansen
 Peak oil
 High-speed rail
 Rail transport in Australia
Corridor selection history for Australian high-speed rail

References

Citations

Sources 

 
 
 
 
 
 
 
 
 
 
 
 
 
 
 

 
Proposed railway lines in Australia